The Leeuwpan Coal Mine is a coal mine located in the Mpumalanga Province. The mine has coal reserves amounting to 160 million tonnes of coking coal, one of the largest coal reserves in Africa and the world. The mine produces around 3 million tonnes of coal per year.

References 

Coal mines in South Africa
Geography of Mpumalanga
Economy of Mpumalanga